Tiger Muay Thai is a Thai mixed martial arts and muay thai training facility located in Phuket, Thailand. It has several prominent competitors such as UFC champions Petr Yan, Alexander Volkanovski and Valentina Shevchenko.

History 
William McNamara – an American teaching English in Darasamuth Catholic School – had previously owned a gym in Phuket consisting of only one ring to serve his muay thai training purposes. The gym gained popularity, so with help from investors he founded Tiger Muay Thai in remarkably larger premises in 2003. Subsequently, mixed martial arts program was added to the repertoire by McNamara.

Since 2013, the gym has been arranging annual Fight Team tryouts where the best applicants receive scholarships to mixed martial arts and muay thai programs. Among the tryout winners are Kai Kara-France, Dan Hooker, Dave Leduc, Loma Lookboonmee and Casey O'Neill.

In 2015, the gym was sold to Thai businessmen and one of them – Viwat Sakulrat – became the managing director of the gym. It has continued to grow and is one of the world's most prominent muay thai gyms.

In July 2021, Hickman brothers announced they were leaving the team after an amicable split. In April 2022, they opened their own gym called Bangtao Muay Thai & MMA.

Gyms
While the original Tiger Muay Thai in Chalong, Phuket remains the headquarters, they opened a new facility to San Sai District, Chiang Mai in 2013.

In 2019, they opened Tiger Muay Thai Beachside in Chalong.

Notable fighters 

 Anatoly Malykhin, Current ONE Light Heavyweight and Interim Heavyweight World Champion
 Fabrício Andrade, Current ONE Bantamweight World Champion
 Petr Yan, a Former UFC Bantamweight Champion
 Tang Kai, Current ONE Featherweight World Champion
 Vitaly Bigdash, a Former ONE Middleweight World Champion
 Alexander Volkanovski, a UFC Featherweight Champion
 Israel Adesanya, a former UFC Middleweight Champion
 Valentina Shevchenko, a former UFC Women's Flyweight Champion
 Antonina Shevchenko
 Dan Hooker
 Rafael Fiziev
 Tai Tuivasa
 Arman Tsarukyan
 Loma Lookboonmee, the first Thai mixed martial artist in the UFC
 Shannon Wiratchai
 Roger Huerta
 Cyrus Washington
 Brad Riddell
 Kai Kara-France
 Timofey Nastyukhin
 Dave Leduc, a Canadian Lethwei fighter and a WLC Cruiserweight Champion
 Anissa Meksen, a French kickboxer and Glory Women's Super Bantamweight Champion
 Mairbek Taisumov
 Alexey Kunchenko
 Khamzat Chimaev
 Topnoi Kiwram
 Kairat Akhmetov, a Former ONE Flyweight World Champion

External links

References

Mixed martial arts training facilities
Kickboxing training facilities
Kickboxing in Thailand
Companies based in Phuket Province